Fifth is the fifth studio album by American indie band The Autumn Defense. It was released in January 2014 by Yep Roc Records.

Track listing
All tracks composed by Pat Sansone and John Stirratt; except where indicated

Personnel
John Stirratt - lead and backing vocals, acoustic and electric guitar, bass, keyboards
Patrick Sansone - lead and backing vocals, acoustic and electric guitar, mellotron, percussion, piano, electric piano, organ, synthesizer, bass
Greg Wieczorek - drums, percussion
James Haggerty - bass
John Pirruccello - electric guitar, slide guitar, baritone guitar, pedal steel
Laveeta Robinson - backing vocals on "Can't Love Anyone Else"

References

2014 albums
Yep Roc Records albums
The Autumn Defense albums